Gil Nelson (born 1949) is a botanist, naturalist, author and speaker in the Southeastern United States.

Bibliography
The Trees of Florida  2010 – 480 pages
Best Native Plants for Southern Gardens: A Handbook for Gardeners 2010 – 352 pages
National Wildlife Federation Field Guide to Trees of North America with Bruce Kershner and Craig Tufts 2008 – 528 pages
Atlantic Coastal Plain Wildflowers: A Guide to Common Wildflowers  2006 – 272 pages
East Gulf Coastal Plain Wildflowers: A Field Guide... 2005 - 263 pages (A guide to the common wildflowers in the Gulf Coastal region of Georgia, Florida, Alabama, and Mississippi including 300 color photographs)
 Florida's best native landscape plants 2003 – 411 pages
The ferns of Florida: a reference and field guide  2000 – 208 pages
The shrubs and woody vines of Florida: a reference and field guide 1996 – 392 pages
Exploring wild northwest Florida 1995 – 270 pages
Exploring wild north Florida 1995 – 244 pages

References

External links
Gil Nelson bio

Living people
1949 births
21st-century American botanists